Cadmium phosphide (Cd3P2) is an inorganic chemical compound. It is a grey or white bluish solid semiconductor material with a bandgap of 0.5 eV. It has applications as a pesticide, material for laser diodes and for high-power-high-frequency electronics.

Synthesis and reactions
Cadmium phosphide can be prepared by the reaction of cadmium with phosphorus:
6 Cd  +  P4   →  2 Cd3P2

Structure
Cd3P2 has a room-temperature tetragonal form.

The crystalline structure of cadmium phosphide is very similar to that of zinc phosphide (Zn3P2), cadmium arsenide (Cd3As2) and zinc arsenide (Zn3As2). These compounds of the Zn-Cd-P-As quaternary system exhibit full continuous solid-solution.

Applications

Safety 
Like other metal phosphides, it is acutely toxic when swallowed due to the formation of phosphine gas when it reacts with gastric acid. It is also carcinogen and dangerous for the skin, eyes and other organs in a large part due to cadmium poisoning.

References

Phosphides
phosphide
II-V semiconductors
II-V compounds